Horaiclavus stenocyma is a species of sea snail, a marine gastropod mollusk in the family Horaiclavidae.

It was previously included within the family Turridae.

The original figure and description are of little value.

Description

Distribution
This marine species occurs off Japan.

References

 Kuroda, T.; Habe, T.; Oyama, K. (1971). The Sea Shells of Sagami Bay. Maruzen Co., Tokyo. xix, 1–741 (Japanese text), 1–489 (English text), 1–51 (Index), pls 1–121.

External links
  Tucker, J.K. 2004 Catalog of recent and fossil turrids (Mollusca: Gastropoda). Zootaxa 682:1–1295.
 

stenocyma